Exodus is a 2007 military science fiction novel, and sequel to the "Stars at War" series, written by Steve White and Shirley Meier.

Plot summary
Advanced aliens depart their homeworld in order to flee their stars impending nova.

Decades after the Terran Civil War the aliens arrive and attempt to colonize an inhabited human world. They are not able to recognize the intelligence of the planet's inhabitants, because they do not recognize human forms of communication as communication.

The miscommunication leads to warfare, where these new aliens throw themselves at their opponents with suicidal fury. The old "anti Bug" alliance partners join together to fight off this new threat.

References

External links 

 An excerpt of Exodus is available for download or reading online at the Baen Free Library here.

2007 American novels
American science fiction novels
2007 science fiction novels
Baen Books available as e-books
Collaborative novels
Military science fiction novels
Fiction about novae
Alien invasions in novels